Diwa or DIWA may refer to:
 Diva, Maharashtra, India
 A Directory of Important Wetlands in Australia
 Diwa: Studies in Philosophy and Theology
 Ladislao Diwa (1863–1930), Filipino patriot
 Tropical Storm Diwa
 Voith DIWA, a bus transmission
 DIgital Wireless Audio, a 5 GHz wireless audio network from Neutrik
 Noureddine Diwa (1937-2020), Tunisian footballer